Rhene punctatus is a species of jumping spider in the genus Rhene that lives in South Africa. The male was identified in 2013 and has distinctive black dots on its abdomen, which gives rise to its name.

Taxonomy
Rhene punctatus was first identified by Wanda Wesołowska and Charles Haddad in 2013. It was allocated to the genus Rhene, which is named after the Greek female name, shared by mythological figures. The species name is derived from the Latin for point, punctus, and relates to the dotted pattern on the abdomen.

Description
Only the male of the species has been described. The spider is flat, stocky and hairy. Both the carapace and abdoment are covered with dense white hairs.

Distribution
Rhene punctatus has only been found in the Cathedral Peak Nature Reserve in KwaZulu-Natal, South Africa.

References

Endemic fauna of South Africa
Salticidae
Spiders of South Africa
Spiders described in 2013
Taxa named by Wanda Wesołowska